James Mooney (February 10, 1861 – December 22, 1921) was an American ethnographer who lived for several years among the Cherokee. Known as "The Indian Man", he conducted major studies of Southeastern Indians, as well as of tribes on the Great Plains. He did ethnographic studies of the Ghost Dance, a spiritual movement among various Native American culture groups, after Sitting Bull's death in 1890. His works on the Cherokee include The Sacred Formulas of the Cherokees (1891), and Myths of the Cherokee (1900). All were published by the US Bureau of American Ethnology, within the Smithsonian Institution. 

Native American artifacts collected by Mooney are held in the collections of the Department of Anthropology, National Museum of Natural History, Smithsonian Institution and the Department of Anthropology, Field Museum of Natural History. Papers and photographs from Mooney are in the collections of the National Anthropological Archives, Department of Anthropology, Smithsonian Institution.

Early life
James Mooney was born on February 10, 1861, in Richmond, Indiana, son of Irish Catholic immigrants. His formal education was limited to the public schools of the city. He became a self-taught expert on American tribes by his own studies and his careful observation during long residences with different groups. The field of ethnography was new in the late 19th century, and he helped create high standards for the work.

Early career
In 1885 he started working with the Bureau of American Ethnology (now part of the Smithsonian Institution) at Washington, D.C., under John Wesley Powell. He compiled a list of Native American tribes that totaled 3,000 names. It ended after the US Army's 1890 massacre of Lakota people at Wounded Knee, South Dakota. Mooney became recognized as a national expert on the American Indian.

Writing career 
Mooney's writing style was widely considered as evocative. His sympathetic treatment of Native Americans is attributed to his upbringing and ethnic heritage. Although he wrote as a scientist, his objective attitude toward Native Americans contrasted with other writing, which was often either romantic or discriminatory. He largely accepted the goal of Indian assimilation as outlined by reformers of the era. But, he was a witness to what the costs were to the traditional peoples and reported on issues and changes with objectivity.

During the late 1800s Native Americans were under harsh attack in many areas, and essentially subjects of genocide by the United States of America. The Indian Wars, intended to suppress tribal resistance to European-American settlement of the West, was generally presented as required because Native Americans made unjustified attacks on pioneers. Mooney wrote more objectively about issues in the West.

Mooney took the time to observe various Native American tribes in the way they lived on a daily basis. Prior to his work, most people outside reservations learned about issues only from a distance. He wanted to learn and to teach other Americans about their culture. He published several books based on his studies of Native American tribes.

The Ghost-dance Religion and the Sioux Outbreak of 1890 
Mooney provides a preface with a historical survey of comparable millenarian movements among other American Indian groups. In response to the rapid spread of the Ghost Dance among tribes of the western United States in the early 1890s, Mooney set out to describe and understand the phenomenon. He visited Wovoka, the Ghost Dance prophet, at his home in Nevada. He also traced the movement of the Ghost Dance from place to place, describing the ritual and recording the distinctive song lyrics of seven separate tribes.

Calendar History of the Kiowa Indians (1898) 
"The desire to preserve to future ages the memory of past achievements is a universal human instinct,"Mooney said. "The reliability of the record depends chiefly on the truthfulness of the recorder and the adequacy of the method employed." Mooney earned the confidence of the Kiowa who told him about their system of calendars to record events. They told him that the first calendar keeper in their tribe was Little Bluff, or Tohausan, principal chief of the tribe from 1833 to 1866. Mooney also worked with two other calendar keepers, Settan, or Little Bear; and Ankopaingyadete, meaning "In the Middle of Many Tracks", and commonly known as Anko. Other Plains tribes kept pictorial records, which are known as winter counts. They were commonly created in the winter, when the people were indoors, and expressed major events of the year.

The Kiowa recorded two events for each year, offering a finer-grained record and twice as many entries for any given period. Silver Horn (1860–1940), or Haungooah, was the most highly esteemed artist of the Kiowa tribe in the 19th and 20th centuries, and kept a calendar. He was a respected religious leader in his later years.

Myths of the Cherokee (1900) 
Mooney also spent much time with the Cherokee, by then removed to Indian Territory (in what is now Oklahoma and North Carolina). For many years he worked with Eastern Band of Cherokee Indians elder and translator Will West Long. He studied their language, culture, and mythology. This comprehensive volume compiled 126 Cherokee myths, including sacred stories, animal myths, local legends, wonder stories, historical traditions, and miscellaneous myths and legends. Some myths included:

 How the World was Made
 Why the Deer's Teeth are Blunt
 How the Turkey got his Beard
 Why the Possum's Tail is Bare

The book also includes original Cherokee manuscripts, relating to the history, archaeology, geographic nomenclature, personal names, botany, medicine, arts, home life, religion, songs, ceremonies, and language of the tribe.

Historical Sketch of the Cherokee (1975) 
Published posthumously, this account of the Cherokee started with their first contact with whites and, through battles won and lost, treaties signed then broken, towns destroyed and people massacred, ended around 1900. There is humanity along with inhumanity in the relations between the Cherokee and other groups, Indian and non-Indian; there is fortitude and persistence balanced with disillusionment and frustration. In these respects, the history of the Cherokee epitomizes the experience of most Native Americans, Mooney writes. This, among with most, if not all of Mooney's works, is considered dispassionate and matter-of-fact, which is why his works are found in the Bureau of American Ethnology.

Personal life and death

He married Ione Lee Gaut on September 28, 1897, in Washington, D.C., and had six children. One son was the writer Paul Mooney. Mooney died of heart disease in Washington, D.C., on December 22, 1921. He was buried in Mount Olivet Cemetery in Washington, D.C.

Bibliography

 Mooney, James. Linguistic families of Indian tribes north of Mexico, with provisional list of principal tribal names and synonyms. US Bureau of American Ethnology, 1885.
 Mooney, James. The Sacred Formulas of the Cherokees. US Bureau of American Ethnology, 1885-6 Annual Report, 1891.
 Mooney, James. Siouan tribes of the East. US Bureau of American Ethnology Bulletin, 1894.
Mooney, James. The Ghost-dance religion and the Sioux outbreak of 1890. US Bureau of American Ethnology, 1892-3 Annual Report, 2 vols., 1896.
 Mooney, James. Calendar history of the Kiowa Indians. US Bureau of American Ethnology, 1895-6 Annual Report, 1898.
 Mooney, James. Myths of the Cherokee. US Bureau of American Ethnology, 1897-8 Annual Report, 1902.
 Mooney, James. Indian missions north of Mexico. US Bureau of American Ethnology Bulletin, 1907.
 Mooney, James. The Swimmer manuscript: Cherokee sacred formulas and medicinal prescriptions, revised, completed and edited by Frans M. Olbrechts, 1932.
 Mooney, James, 1861–1921. "James Mooney's history, myths, and sacred formulas of the Cherokees :containing the full texts of Myths of the Cherokee (1900) and The sacred formulas of the Cherokees (1891) as published by the Bureau of American Ethnology : with a new biographical introduction. 
 Ellison, George, James Mooney and the eastern Cherokees, Asheville, NC: Historical Images, 1992.

Full etexts of many of the above are available at archive.org

References

External links
 
 
 
 
 
 Sacred Formulas of the Cherokees (digitized text)
 Ghost dance recordings of 1894  at The Public Domain Review
 Register to the Papers of James Mooney at the National Anthropological Archives
 Smithsonian Anthropologist JoAllyn Archambault video discussing Mooney can be viewed as part of series 19th Century Explorers and Anthropologists: Developing the Earliest Smithsonian Anthropology Collections

1861 births
1921 deaths
19th-century American writers
20th-century American writers
American anthropologists
American ethnographers
American folklorists
Burials at Mount Olivet Cemetery (Washington, D.C.)
Cherokee culture
Cherokee Nation (1794–1907)
History of the Cherokee
Linguists of Iroquoian languages
Writers from Richmond, Indiana